BRP Suluan (MRRV-4406) is the fifth ship of the Parola-class patrol vessels of the Philippine Coast Guard.

Design and features
The Philippine Coast Guard clarified that the ship is a law enforcement vessel and is designed to conduct environmental and humanitarian missions, as well as maritime security operations and patrol missions.

The ship was designed with a bulletproof navigation bridge, and is equipped with fire monitors, night vision capability, a work boat, and radio direction finder capability.

The ship will be equipped with communications and radio monitoring equipment from Rohde & Schwarz, specifically the M3SR Series 4400 and Series 4100 software-defined communication radios, and DDF205 radio monitoring equipment. These equipment enhances the ship's reconnaissance, pursuit and communications capabilities.

Construction, delivery and commissioning
BRP Suluan underwent sea trials since June 2017 until it was delivered. On 7 August 2017, Philippine Coast Guard formally received the ship at a ceremony held on Philippine Coast Guard headquarters in Manila.

Service history

BRP Suluan participated in the field training phase of SEACAT 2017 Exercise.

The drill was held in Manila Bay and featured the mock hijacking of a vessel and arrest of the perpetrators aboard the ship.

References

External links 

Parola-class patrol boats
2017 ships
Ships built by Japan Marine United